Pârâul lui Martin may refer to:

 Pârâul lui Martin, a tributary of the Schit in Neamț County
 Pârâul lui Martin (Jijia), a tributary of the Jijia in Botoșani County